Elagabalus, Aelagabalus, Heliogabalus, or simply Elagabal (Aramaic: 𐡁𐡋‎𐡄𐡂‎𐡀𐡋 ʾĕlāhgabāl or 𐡁𐡋‎𐡄𐡀𐡂‎𐡀𐡋 ʾĕlāhaʾgabāl; Arabic: إله الجبل Ilah al-Jabal, "mountain god") was an Arab-Roman sun god, initially venerated in Emesa (modern-day Homs), Syria. Although there were many variations of the name, the god was consistently referred to as Elagabalus in Roman coins and inscriptions from AD 218 on, during the reign of emperor Elagabalus.

Cult

Elagabalus was initially venerated at Emesa in Syria, where the Arab Emesan dynasty acted as its priests. The name is the Latinised form of the Arabic "Ilah al-Jabal" ("إله الجبل"), the Emesene manifestation of the deity, which is Arabic for "God of the Mountain." Elagabalus was the religious "lord", or Ba'al, of Emesa. The deity successfully preserved Arab characteristics, both in his names and in his representations.

The cult of the deity spread to other parts of the Roman Empire in the second century, where he would be revered as Elagabalos (Ἐλαγάβαλος Elagábalos) by the Greeks and Elagabalus by the Romans. For example, a dedication has been found as far away as Woerden, in the modern-day Netherlands.

In Rome
The cult stone or baetyl was brought to Rome by the Emperor Marcus Aurelius Antoninus Augustus, who, before his accession, was the hereditary high priest at Emesa and was commonly called Elagabalus after the deity. The Syrian deity was assimilated with the Roman sun god known as Sol and later Sol Invictus ("the unconquered Sun").

A temple called the Elagabalium was built on the east face of the Palatine Hill to house the holy stone of the Emesa temple, a black conical meteorite. Herodian writes of that stone:

Herodian also related that Elagabalus forced senators to watch while he danced around his deity's altar to the sound of drums and cymbals, and at each summer solstice celebrated a great festival, popular with the masses because of food distributions, during which he placed the holy stone on a chariot adorned with gold and jewels, which he paraded through the city:

Herodian's description strongly suggests that the Emesene cult was inspired by the Babylonian Akitu-festival.

According to Cassius Dio, the Emperor also tried to bring about a union of Roman and Syrian religion under the supremacy of his deity, which he placed even above Jupiter, and to which he assigned either Astarte, Minerva or Urania, or some combination of the three, as wife. The most sacred relics from the Roman religion were transferred from their respective shrines to the Elagabalium, including "the emblem of the Great Mother, the fire of Vesta, the Palladium, the shields of the Salii, and all that the Romans held sacred". He reportedly also declared that Jews, Samaritans and Christians must transfer their rites to his temple so that it "might include the mysteries of every form of worship".

According to Herodian, after the emperor was killed in 222, his religious edicts were reversed and the cult of Elagabalus returned to Emesa.

See also
 Black Stone
 Homs
 Hubal
 Royal family of Emesa

References

Further reading
 M. Pietrzykowsky, "Die Religionspolitik des Kaisers Elagabal", in: Aufstieg und Niedergang der römischen Welt II 16.3 (1986) 806–1825

External links

Livius.org: Elagabal

Ancient Syria
Arabian gods
Elagabalus
Religion in Syria
Roman gods
Solar gods
Sol Invictus

ca:Sol Invictus